The Lodi Arch, also known as Mission Arch, in Lodi, California, is one of the few remaining Mission Revival ceremonial structures within the state of California.  It was built in 1907 by architect E. B. Brown for the first Lodi Tokay Carnival, which still occurs annually as the Lodi Grape Festival. The following year, a California Golden Bear and a sign reading "Lodi" were added to the arch. The arch was restored in 1956 after its deteriorating condition made it a safety hazard; the golden bear was turned to the North in 1956 and has also been restored twice, in the 1940s and in 2001. In addition to its architectural significance, the arch serves as a symbol of Lodi and a focal point for the city's downtown.

It was listed as both a California Historical Landmark and on the National Register of Historic Places in 1980.

References

External links

Buildings and structures on the National Register of Historic Places in California
Buildings and structures completed in 1907
Buildings and structures in San Joaquin County, California
Arch
National Register of Historic Places in San Joaquin County, California